The 2011 O'Byrne Cup was a Gaelic football competition played by the teams of Leinster GAA. The competition differs from the Leinster Senior Football Championship as it also features further education colleges and the winning team does not progress to another tournament at All-Ireland level. The holders of the O'Byrne Cup were DCU. This edition of the O'Byrne Cup began on 9 January 2011.

O'Byrne Cup

First round
The eight winning teams from the first round of the O'Byrne Cup went on to qualify for the quarter finals of the tournament. The losers of the first round went on to the O'Byrne Shield quarter finals.  All the first round matches were originally scheduled to take place on 9 January 2011, however several were postponed due to frozen pitched at the scheduled venues.

Quarter-finals

Semi-finals

Final

O'Byrne Shield
The O'Byrne Shield consists of the 8 losing teams from the first round of the O'Byrne Cup.

Quarter-finals

Semi-finals

Final

See also
 2011 Dr McKenna Cup

References

O'Byrne Cup
O'Byrne Cup